The Dukes of Hazzard is the original soundtrack from the television series The Dukes of Hazzard. It should not be confused with the motion picture soundtrack with almost the same name. Released originally by Scotti Brothers Records in 1982 then re-released in 2005 on compact disc, it includes the theme to the show and one of Schneider's best hits "In the Drivers Seat". Most of the cast performed a song for the soundtrack. Remastered producing by Rob Santos.

Album Details

See also
 The Dukes of Hazzard (2005 film)
 The Dukes of Hazzard (TV series)
 The Dukes of Hazzard: The Beginning (2008 film)
 The Dukes of Hazzard: The Return of General Lee (2004 game)
 The Dukes of Hazzard: Racing for Home (1999 game)
 The Dukes of Hazzard: Reunion! (1997 TV film)
 The Dukes of Hazzard: Hazzard in Hollywood! (2000 film)

References

The Dukes of Hazzard
Scotti Brothers Records soundtracks